Hätzingen is a village, and former municipality, in the municipality of Glarus Süd and canton of Glarus in Switzerland.

History 

Hätzingen is first recorded in 1350 as Hezzinge(n).

In 2004, the municipality of Hätzingen was merged into the municipality of Luchsingen. On 1 January 2011, the municipality of Luchsingen was itself merged into the new municipality of Glarus Süd.

Geography
The village of Diesbach lies to the south. To the north, the next village is Luchsingen, which lies on the west bank of the river, and Haslen, on the east bank.

Transport 
Hätzingen is located on the Hauptstrasse 17, which runs the length of the canton of Glarus before climbing the Klausen Pass into the canton of Uri, as well as on the Weesen to Linthal railway line that parallels the main road and the Linth river through Glarus. The high alpine Klausen Pass is normally only open to traffic between June and September, and for the rest of the year the road and railway up the valley form the only access to the village. The village is served by Luchsingen-Hätzingen railway station, which is served by the hourly Zürich S-Bahn service S25 between Linthal and Zurich.

Demographics
The historical population of Hätzingen is given in the following table:

Notable people
In 1791, Thomas Johannessen Heftye (1767-1827) emigrated from Hätzingen to Norway, where he founded the Thos. Joh. Heftye & Søn bank. The Norwegian branch of the Heftye family included several notable businessmen and politicians, including Johannes Thomassen Heftye (1792–1856), Henrik Thomassen Heftye (1804–1864), Thomas Johannessen Heftye (1822–1886) and Thomas Thomassen Heftye (1860-1921).

References

External links
 
 Hätzingen from Glarus Süd municipal web site (in German)
 

Former municipalities of the canton of Glarus
Villages in the canton of Glarus